Abakwa may refer to:

Bamenda, a city in Cameroon
Abakuá, a secret society with roots in eastern Nigeria, and the style of music played by its members